James D. Smith (born October 18, 1936) is a former American football player who played with the Oakland Raiders and Chicago Bears. He played college football at Compton Community College.

References

1936 births
Living people
American football fullbacks
Compton Tartars football players
Oakland Raiders players
Chicago Bears players
Players of American football from Los Angeles
American Football League players